Cherry Valley is a village of  in the Kishwaukee River valley, which lies primarily in Winnebago County. Approximately ten percent of the village is within Boone County. The village is within the Rockford, Illinois Metropolitan Statistical Area, and borders the southeast side of Rockford. The population is 2905 at the 2020 census, down from 3,162 as of the 2010 census.

History
Official documents from the Winnebago County Clerk's office and the Village of Cherry Valley state Cherry Valley was settled in 1836. The first settler within Cherry Valley was Joseph Griggs who, along with his family, settled on the north bank of the Kishwaukee River in 1835. Cherry Valley was incorporated as a village on January 31, 1857. Early landmark events for Cherry Valley was the establishment of a mill on the Kishwaukee River, and the coming of the railroad in 1852.

Early on Cherry Valley was called by various names, such as "Griggs Ford" and Graball, and then other names, before the present name was adopted. After deciding to change the name, the people put their suggestions into a hat.  A Mrs. Butler, from Cherry Valley, New York placed the name of Cherry Valley in the hat and that name was selected. The core of the village, centered on its main street businesses in small brick buildings, is surrounded by several blocks of houses built in the 19th century.  This late 19th-century appearance is further accentuated by turn-of-the-20th-century-style lamp lights as well as the original brick paving along the eastern end of main street.

Relationship with Rockford
Although close to Rockford, Cherry Valley was far enough away to be considered, for most of its history, not a part of the Rockford community. However, with the advent of modern transportation in the later 20th century, Cherry Valley became in essence a suburb of Rockford. As the city of Rockford grew and expanded its boundaries, it came in direct contact with Cherry Valley. Since that time, there have been land control-related issues between the two municipalities. For the most part, these issues have been resolved with a boundary agreement between the two communities.

Cherry Valley today
In the last dozen years Cherry Valley has seen a shift towards Chicago, with roughly a third of its new residents being former Chicago suburban residents who live in the village and commute to work in the Chicago suburbs.  Being near to an interchange on I-90 (Jane Addams Memorial Tollway) contributed to this shift, and in 2006 the toll booths on the Cherry Valley interchange and exit were removed because of increased traffic flow and the need to remove the chronic traffic jams that had built over the years.

Most of Cherry Valley is within the Rockford School District, with a small portion in the Belvidere School District. Schools closed and demolished in 2019

Geography
The core of the village is located a little north of the confluence of the north and south branches of the Kishwaukee river.  There is a slight depression as one moves towards the center of the village, which is a formation of the Kishwaukee river valley.

The north branch of the Kishwaukee River travels through Cherry Valley's central business district. The largest body of water in the village is Cherry Valley Lake which is situated just east of the Kishwaukee River in Baumann Park. The village is served by Interstate 90, Interstate 39, U.S. Route 20 and U.S. Route 51.

Demographics

As of the 2020 census there were 2,905 people, 1,240 households, and 739 families residing in the village. The racial makeup of the village was 82.27% White, 3.06% African American, 0.10% Native American, 4.99% Asian, 2.24% from other races, and 7.33% from two or more races. Hispanic or Latino of any race were 7.13% of the population.

There were 1,240 households, out of which 26.69% had children under the age of 18 living with them, 45.48% were married couples living together, 11.77% had a female householder with no husband present, and 40.40% were non-families. 28.23% of all households were made up of individuals, and 16.85% had someone living alone who was 65 years of age or older. The average household size was 2.59 and the average family size was 2.21.

The village's age distribution consisted of 13.3% under the age of 18, 2.5% from 18 to 24, 23.3% from 25 to 44, 36.8% from 45 to 64, and 24.1% who were 65 years of age or older. The median age was 52.3 years. For every 100 females, there were 104.5 males. For every 100 females age 18 and over, there were 94.0 males.

The median income for a household in the village was $68,397, and the median income for a family was $79,750. Males had a median income of $47,663 versus $40,228 for females. The per capita income for the village was $35,460. About 3.4% of families and 6.6% of the population were below the poverty line, including none of those under age 18 and 10.7% of those age 65 or over.

Cherry Valley has the highest income and education levels of any community within the Rockford metropolitan area.

Development and growth
Key to the village economy is million square foot CherryVale Mall, one of the first enclosed shopping malls in Illinois. Because of this sales tax, Cherry Valley is one of only a handful of communities within Illinois that does not levy a municipal property tax.

Another notable commercial enterprise in Cherry Valley is the Kegel Motorcycle Company, which has a strong claim to being the world's oldest Harley-Davidson dealership.

The town is home to Six Flags Hurricane Harbor Rockford, formerly Magic Waters, which is owned by Rockford Park District and is managed by Six Flags starting 2018.

Notable people
Virgil Abloh is a DJ and fashion designer, with notable brands Off-White and Pyrex Vision. On March 26, 2018, he was named artistic director for men's wear at Louis Vuitton.
John Baumgarten. Businessman, Illinois state representative. He served as mayor of Cherry Valley in 1945. Baumgarten died at Swedish American Hospital in Rockford, Illinois
Mo Pitney (born 1993), country music artist

References

External links

 Cherry Valley, Illinois, official website
 Cherry Valley Historical Society

Villages in Illinois
Villages in Winnebago County, Illinois
Villages in Boone County, Illinois
Rockford metropolitan area, Illinois
Populated places established in 1835
1835 establishments in Illinois